Neapolitan ice cream (sometimes colloquially mispronounced as Napoleon ice cream), also sometimes called Harlequin ice cream, is a type of ice cream composed of three separate flavors (vanilla, chocolate, and strawberry) arranged side by side in the same container, usually without any packaging in between.

History
Neapolitan ice cream was the first type of ice cream to combine three flavors. The first recorded recipe was created by head chef of the royal Prussian household Louis Ferdinand Jungius in 1839, who dedicated the recipe to Fürst Pückler.

Its English-language name arose in the late 19th century as a reflection of its presumed origins in the cuisine of the Italian city of Naples, and the many Neapolitan immigrants who brought their expertise in frozen desserts with them to the United States. Spumone was introduced to the United States in the 1860s as Neapolitan-style ice cream. Early recipes used a variety of flavors; however, the number of three molded together was a common denominator, to resemble the Italian flag (cf. insalata tricolore). More than likely, chocolate, vanilla, and strawberry became the standard because they were the most popular flavors in the United States at the time of introduction.

Quotes from food historians

19th-century descriptions

Cake
In Australia, there is a popular cake known as Neapolitan cake or marble cake, made with the same three colours of Neapolitan ice cream swirled through in a marble pattern, usually topped with pink icing.

See also
 List of ice cream flavors

References

Sources

External links

Flavors of ice cream
Vanilla ice cream
Italian-American cuisine
German cuisine
Neapolitan cuisine